"Black Treacle" is a song by the English indie rock band Arctic Monkeys, released as the fourth single from their fourth studio album Suck It and See and was released as a digital download and a 7" vinyl on 23 January 2012. The single was limited to only 1,500 copies.

The 7" vinyl features only one B-side titled "You and I" and is credited to Richard Hawley and The Death Ramps. The Death Ramps is a pseudonym previously adopted by the band when they released "The Hellcat Spangled Shalalala" single and a limited edition vinyl with "Teddy Picker" B-sides "Nettles" and "The Death Ramps" back in 2007.

A promo video was made for "You and I" which consists of footage while recording the song at the studio and of the band riding motorbikes on the peaks outside Sheffield near Dore. The music video for the single premiered on 5 January 2012 and for "You and I" premiered on 23 January 2012 on YouTube.

Track listing

Personnel
Arctic Monkeys
Alex Turner – lead vocals, lead and rhythm guitar, backing vocals 
Jamie Cook – lead and rhythm guitar
Nick O'Malley – bass guitar, backing vocals
Matt Helders – drums, backing vocals

Additional personnel
Richard Hawley – lead vocals, lead and rhythm guitar

Charts

References

2011 songs
2012 singles
Arctic Monkeys songs
Domino Recording Company singles
Songs written by Alex Turner (musician)
Song recordings produced by James Ford (musician)